Marcia Powell was a 48-year-old incarcerated American woman who died on May 20, 2009, after exposure to extreme heat in an outdoor cage at Arizona State Prison Complex – Perryville in Goodyear, Arizona.

Personal life
Powell had adoptive parents. She ran away from home at 14. Her adoptive father died on November 4, 2008. Her adoptive mother stated that at one point Powell had threatened to kill her. Her adoptive mother was not aware that Powell had died until Maricopa County Public Fiduciary investigator Roger Coventry informed her. At the time of her death, Powell was serving a 27-month sentence for prostitution.

Death
Prison policy limits such outside confinement to a maximum of two hours. She suffered burn blisters all over her body. The county medical examiner found the cause of death to be due to complications from heat exposure. According to a 3,000-page report released by the Arizona Department of Corrections (ADC), she pleaded to be taken back inside but was ignored. She was also not allowed to use the restroom and, as a result, died in her own excrement. Prison administrators fired, suspended or disciplined sixteen corrections employees over Powell's death. The Maricopa County Attorney's Office chose not to prosecute ADC staff in her death, claiming that there was "insufficient evidence to go forward with a prosecution against any of the named individuals".

Legacy
Powell was cremated, and in 2009, her ashes were interred at Shadow Rock United Church of Christ in Phoenix, Arizona. Powell's adoptive kin did not wish to take possession of her ashes, and she had no other next of kin. In 2010, a memorial to Powell was placed at the Brophy College Preparatory school.

By 2010, the deadline for someone to file a lawsuit in an Arizona court related to this case had expired. There are no people who have standing for a federal lawsuit in regards to this case.

Outdoor cage cells are still used in Arizona. However, they now provide shade and include water fountains and benches.

See also
 Box (torture)
 Death of Darren Rainey
 Death of Frank Valdes
 Death of Chavis Carter
 Murder of Liam Ashley
 Suicide of Rodney Hulin
 Joe Arpaio, former sheriff in Maricopa County

References

Further reading
 
 

Prisoners who died in Arizona detention
2009 deaths
2009 in Arizona
Deaths from hyperthermia
Deaths by person in Arizona
May 2009 events in the United States